Abdolreza Rahmani Fazli (born 1959) is an Iranian conservative politician and interior minister of Hassan Rouhani's government. He was the president of Supreme Audit Court from 2008 to 2013.

Early life and education
Fazli was born in Shirvan in 1959. He is a graduate of Ferdowsi University of Mashhad. He also received a PhD in geography from Tarbiat Modarres University.

Career
Fazli served in different positions, including the head of the planning department, member of parliament, deputy chairman of Iranian National TV and Radio, deputy head of economic and international affairs at the ministry of interior. He was appointed secretary and deputy head of the Supreme National Security Council in October 2005. He was the deputy of Ali Larijani in charge of the cultural, social and media affairs during the first presidential term of Mahmoud Ahmedinejad. Fazli resigned from post in November 2007 one month after the appointment of Saeed Jalili as the head of the council.

In July 2008, Fazli was appointed as the president of the Supreme Audit Court. He was reappointed to the post in July 2012 for further four years.

In late July 2013, the Mehr news agency reported that Fazli is the only candidate for interior minister at the cabinet of President Hassan Rouhani. Fazli was nominated by Rouhani for the post on 4 August. He was confirmed by the Parliament on 15 August, replacing Mostafa Mohammad-Najjar in the post. Fazli was given 256 for votes and 19 against votes, while 9 members of the Parliament did not attend the session. On 24 August 2013 President Rouhani additionally appointed Fazli Secretary General of Drug Control Headquarters.

In an interview in November 2019, he referred to the civilian protesters, saying: "We shot them in both the head and the legs, not just the head. We also hit the legs!" 1,500 people were killed during two weeks of unrest across Iran. ·Iranian officials later admitted that they approved live fire against civilians protesters, at the order of Fazili.

Views and alliances
Fazli is a conservative politician and long-term associate of Ali Larijani, former parliament speaker.

Sanctions
In May 2020, the United States Department of State sanctioned Fazli due to his alleged role in the 2019 Iranian protests and committing human rights abuses against the Iranian people.

References

External links

1959 births
Ferdowsi University of Mashad alumni
Government ministers of Iran
Living people
Members of the 4th Islamic Consultative Assembly
Tarbiat Modares University alumni
Iranian individuals subject to the U.S. Department of the Treasury sanctions